Tom Seeberg (February 17, 1860 in Drammen – March 27, 1938 in Drammen) was a Norwegian sport shooter who competed in the early 20th century in rifle shooting. He participated in Shooting at the 1900 Summer Olympics in Paris and won the silver medal with the Norwegian Military Rifle team.

References

External links
 

1860 births
1938 deaths
Norwegian male sport shooters
ISSF rifle shooters
Olympic silver medalists for Norway
Olympic shooters of Norway
Shooters at the 1900 Summer Olympics
Sportspeople from Drammen
Olympic medalists in shooting
Medalists at the 1900 Summer Olympics
20th-century Norwegian people